Buffalo clover may refer to:
 Buffalo clover, Alysicarpus vaginalis, a plant in the genus Alysicarpus
 Buffalo clover, Lupinus subcarnosus, a bluebonnet lupin
 Buffalo clover, Trifolium reflexum, a true clover
 Buffalo clover or running buffalo clover, Trifolium stoloniferum, a true clover